Menachem Brenner is a professor of finance and a Bank and Financial Analysts Faculty Fellow at New York University Stern School of Business.  He teaches a course in options and futures, along with an introduction to finance course.  Brenner also teaches for the Master of Science in Global Finance (MSGF), which is a joint program between Stern and the Hong Kong University of Science and Technology.

Biography
Brenner's primary areas of research include derivative markets, hedging, option pricing, and the stock market.  He developed (with Dan Galai) the VIX volatility index based on the prices of traded index options.

He has also served as an associate editor and referee to several finance journals, and was an editor (with Marti Subrahmanyam) of the Review of Derivatives Research, an academic journal specializing in derivatives markets.

He is a recipient of the Lady Davis Fellowship and of grants from Ford Foundation and the Italian National Research Council.  Before joining NYU Stern, he served as an associate Professor of Finance at the Hebrew University of Jerusalem.  He was also a visiting professor at the University of California at Berkeley, the University of Bergamo, and Tel Aviv University.

He also  served on the board of directors of the Tel Aviv Stock Exchange and was chairman of the New Products Committee and the Index Maintenance Committee.  He was a member of the New York Futures Exchange and of the advisory panel on Emerging Markets Investable Indices at the International Finance Corporation.  Brenner has served as a consultant to leading stock exchanges, banks, and other financial institutions, including American Stock Exchange, Athens Derivatives Exchange, SOFFEX, Bombay Stock Exchange, Tel Aviv Stock Exchange, Bank of Israel, Israel Securities Authority, and Quick Corp.

He was also a floor trader in futures and options on the New York Futures Exchange and the NYSE.  He  has taught in many executive programs for major financial institutions (e.g., JP Morgan, Deutsche Bank, Smith Barney, Yamaichi Securities, Garantia, Swiss Bank Corporation, ICICI, Credit Swiss).  He also served as a consultant to major law firms on a variety of issues involving the securities markets, in particular derivatives securities and especially executive stock options.    He was an organizer and speaker at the annual and International American Stock Exchange Options Colloquium.

Professional activities
Member of the board of directors of the Tel Aviv Stock Exchange (TASE), chairman of the new products committee and chairman of the stock indices committee
Consultant on the design and implementation of stock indices and stock index options for the TASE
Consultant/lecturer on derivatives to major exchanges:  TASE, AMSE, NYSE, Bombay Stock Exchange, Athens Derivatives Exchange
Consultant to the Israeli Securities Authority on various aspects of the capital markets and derivative products
Consultant to the central bank in Israel (Bank of Israel)
Designer of a volatility index used by the French commodities exchange (MONEP)
Designer of volatility indices for the leading vendor of financial data services in Japan (Quick Corp)
Designer of investable indices of emerging markets for the International Finance Corporation (World Bank)
Consultant to a large Israeli bank in the area of new financial products
Designer of volatility derivative products for The American Stock Exchange
Consultant in arbitration cases involving derivatives
Consultant to an Israeli securities firm on the design and management of a derivatives department
Consultant for various projects in the area of derivatives, including valuation of Executive Options
Consultant on a risk management system for a major bank in Israel
Executive teacher of futures and options to major American and European banks, to a Japanese securities firm, and to a Brazilian investment bank (e.g., Deutsche Bank, Yamaichi Securities, Smith Barney, Garantia, JP Morgan, Credit Suisse, ICICI)

Publications
Brenner's articles have appeared in the Journal of Finance, the Journal of Financial Economics, the Journal of Business, and the Journal of Financial and Quantitative Analysis.   He has also edited a book on option pricing.

Education
Brenner received the BS degree in economics from Hebrew University of Jerusalem, and the MA and PhD degrees from Cornell.

References

External links
NYU Stern Profile
Menachem Brenner’s Biography
Master of Science in Global Finance

New York University Stern School of Business faculty
Living people
Year of birth missing (living people)
Hebrew University of Jerusalem Faculty of Social Sciences alumni
Cornell University alumni